Jonathan Moss is an American lightweight rower. He won a gold medal at the 1993 World Rowing Championships in Račice with the lightweight men's four.

References

Year of birth missing (living people)
Living people
American male rowers
World Rowing Championships medalists for the United States
Pan American Games medalists in rowing
Pan American Games gold medalists for the United States
Rowers at the 1995 Pan American Games